Giovanni Battista Lercari may refer to:
Giovanni Battista Lercari (1507–1592), Doge of Genoa 1563-1565
Giovanni Battista Lercari (1576–1657), Doge of Genoa 1642-1644